Proterogomphidae is a dragonfly family from the Cretaceous.

References

External links 
 
 
 

Cretaceous insects
Prehistoric odonates
†
Prehistoric insect families